Mawlawi Abdul Rahman Muslim, also known as Abdul Rahman Kunduzi is an Afghan Taliban politician who is currently serving as Governor of Samangan Province.  He was also interviewed by Ghaith Abdul-Ahad that year. He was imprisoned in October 2012, but later released and led the takeover of Samangan in summer 2021.

References

Living people
Year of birth missing (living people)
Taliban governors
Governors of Samangan Province
People from Kunduz